The 2011 Korea Open was a women's tennis tournament played on outdoor hard courts. It was the 8th edition of the Korea Open, and was part of the WTA International tournaments of the 2011 WTA Tour. It took place at the Seoul Olympic Park Tennis Center in Seoul, South Korea, from September 19 through September 25, 2010.

Finals

Singles

 María José Martínez Sánchez defeated  Galina Voskoboeva, 7–6(7–0), 7–6(7–2)
It was Martínez Sánchez's 2nd title of the year and 5th of her career, her first coming on hardcourts.

Doubles

 Natalie Grandin /  Vladimíra Uhlířová defeated  Vera Dushevina /  Galina Voskoboeva 7–6(7–5), 6–4

Entrants

 1 Seeds are based on the rankings of September 12.

Other entrants
The following players received wildcards into the singles main draw:
  Marion Bartoli
  Dominika Cibulková
  Kim So-jung 
  Francesca Schiavone

The following players received entry from the qualifying draw:

  Kristýna Plíšková
  Nicole Rottmann
  Yurika Sema
  Yaroslava Shvedova

External links
Official website
Singles, Doubles, and Qualifying Singles Draws

Korea Open
2011
September 2011 sports events in South Korea